June Travis (born June Dorothea Grabiner; August 7, 1914 – April 14, 2008) was an American film actress.

Background
Born June Dorothea Grabiner, she was the daughter of Harry Grabiner, vice-president of the Chicago White Sox in the 1930s.

She had dark brown hair and green eyes. She stood 5'4" tall. She attended Parkside Grammar School in Chicago and the Starrett School for Girls. She later studied at UCLA. When she returned to Illinois, she matriculated at the University of Chicago.

Marriage
On January 3, 1940, Travis married Fred Friedlob. They had two daughters, Cathy and June. Friedlob died in May 1979 in Chicago.

Screen actress

A Paramount Pictures vice-president noticed her in Miami, Florida, at a White Sox exhibition game.  He offered Travis a screen test when she came to Pasadena, California, where the major league baseball team trained. The first time she was presented with a screen contract, she suffered from screen fright and turned it down.  She returned to Chicago and school and the next winter, accepted a film studio offer in Palm Springs, California.

Travis made her screen debut in Stranded (1935), a film which starred Kay Francis and George Brent. She played the role of Mary Rand. She followed this with a part in Not On Your Life (1935), with Warren William and Claire Dodd. Howard Hawks directed her in Ceiling Zero (1936), a Warner Bros. feature. In preparation for her role, Travis learned flying, navigation, and parachute jumping from Amelia Earhart. The aviator gave her instructions in September 1935, including the film stars James Cagney and Pat O'Brien. Also in 1936, she portrayed secretary Della Street to Perry Mason as played by Ricardo Cortez in The Case of the Black Cat.

She was Ronald Reagan's leading lady in his first movie, Love Is on the Air, in 1937.

Her most notable film role was likely in The Star (1952) starring Bette Davis.

Travis became known as the Queen of the B-movies on the Warner Bros. lot. Later, she said that if she had remained in Hollywood two more years, she would have been a star. However, following three years, she came home to Chicago for Christmas with her parents. She did not return to making motion pictures.  Travis stopped regularly appearing in films after 1938, though she made minor appearances in The Star and Monster a Go-Go.

Radio
Travis played Stormy Wilson Curtis in the radio soap opera Girl Alone and Bernice in Arnold Grimm's Daughter, another soap opera.

Death
On April 14, 2008, Travis, age 93, died in a hospital of complications from a stroke she suffered weeks earlier. She is buried in Chicago's Oak Woods Cemetery.

Filmography

 Stranded (1935) (with Kay Francis and George Brent) – Mary Rand
 Don't Bet on Blondes (1935) (with Warren William and Guy Kibbee) – Telephone Operator (uncredited)
 Bright Lights (1935) (with Joe E. Brown) – Party Guest (uncredited)
 Broadway Gondolier (1935) (with Dick Powell and Joan Blondell) – Hatcheck Girl (uncredited)
 The Case of the Lucky Legs (1935) (with Warren William and Genevieve Tobin) – George's Lady Friend (uncredited)
 Shipmates Forever (1935) (with Dick Powell and Ruby Keeler) – Cigarette Girl (uncredited)
 Dr. Socrates (1935) (with Paul Muni) – Dublin
 Broadway Hostess (1935) – Mrs. Bannister (uncredited)
 Ceiling Zero (1936) (with James Cagney) – Tommy Thomas
 Times Square Playboy (1936) (with Warren William) – Beth Calhoun,aka Fay Melody
 Earthworm Tractors (1936) (with Joe E. Brown) – Mabel Johnson
 Bengal Tiger (1936) (with Barton MacLane) – Laura Homan Ballenger
 Jailbreak (1936) (with Barton Maclane and Craig Reynolds) – Jane Rogers
 The Big Game (1936) (with Philip Huston and James Gleason) – Margaret Anthony
 The Case of the Black Cat (1936) (with Ricardo Cortez) – Della Street
 Join the Marines (1937) (with Paul Kelly) – Paula Denbrough
 Circus Girl (1937) (with Robert Livingston and Donald Cook) – Kay Rogers
 Men in Exile (1937) (with Dick Purcell) – Sally Haines
 Love Is on the Air (1937) (with Ronald Reagan) – Jo Hopkins
 Over the Goal (1937) (with William Hopper and Johnnie Davis) – Lucille Martin
 Exiled to Shanghai (1937) (with Wallace Ford and Dean Jagger) – Nancy Jones
 The Kid Comes Back (1938) (with Wayne Morris) – Mary Malone
 Over the Wall (1938) (with Dick Foran) – Kay Norton
 Go Chase Yourself (1938) (with Joe Penner and Lucille Ball) – Judy Daniels
 The Marines Are Here (1938) (with Gordon Oliver) – Terry Foster
 The Gladiator (1938) (with Joe E. Brown) – Iris Bennett
 Mr. Doodle Kicks Off (1938) (with Joe Penner) – Janice Martin
 The Night Hawk (1938) (with Robert Livingston) – Della Parrish
 Little Orphan Annie (1938) (with Ann Gillis) – Mary Ellen
 Federal Man-Hunt (1938) (with Robert Livingston) – Anne Lawrence
 The Star (1952) (with Bette Davis) – Phyllis Stone
 Monster A Go-Go (1965) (with Paul Morton) – Ruth (final film role)

References
 

 Long Beach Press-Telegram, "Actress looks back at what might have been", April 23, 1977, p. 16
 Los Angeles Times, "Wrong Sex For Baseball, Girl Turns Actress", April 15, 1935, p. 19
 Los Angeles Times, "Another Society Bud Lured To Movies", April 20, 1935, p. 13
 Los Angeles Times, "The Pageant of the Film World", April 27, 1935, p. A9
 Los Angeles Times, "Kirkland's Troth Seen", August 20, 1935, p. A1
 The New York Times, "Screen Notes", September 21, 1935, p. 18
 New York Times, "Miss Earhart Teaches Aviation", September 26, 1935, p. 25
 Chicago Tribune, "June Travis Friedlob 1914 ~ 2008", April 16, 2008

External links

 
 
 June Travis at Virtual History

1914 births
2008 deaths
American film actresses
American stage actresses
Actresses from Chicago
University of California, Los Angeles alumni
University of Chicago alumni
20th-century American actresses
21st-century American women